Lock and Dam No. 16 is a lock and dam located near Muscatine, Iowa on the Upper Mississippi River around river mile 457.2.

See also
 Public Works Administration dams list

References

External links

Lock and Dam No. 16 - U.S. Army Corps of Engineers

Transport infrastructure completed in 1937
National Register of Historic Places in Muscatine County, Iowa
Mississippi River locks
Buildings and structures in Muscatine County, Iowa
16
16
16
Buildings and structures in Rock Island County, Illinois
Dams in Illinois
Roller dams
Gravity dams
Dams on the Mississippi River
Mississippi Valley Division
Historic American Engineering Record in Iowa
Historic American Engineering Record in Illinois
Historic districts in Muscatine County, Iowa
Historic districts on the National Register of Historic Places in Iowa
16
Transportation buildings and structures in Rock Island County, Illinois
Transportation buildings and structures in Muscatine County, Iowa